Dušan Mladenović (born 18 September 1995) is a Serbian footballer, who plays for Dubočica.

References

External links
 
 
 

1995 births
Living people
Sportspeople from Leskovac
Association football defenders
Serbian footballers
FK Moravac Mrštane players
FK Dinamo Vranje players
Serbian First League players
FK Sileks players
Expatriate footballers in North Macedonia
Serbian expatriate sportspeople in North Macedonia